Kampong Sungai Lampai is a village in Brunei-Muara District, Brunei. It is also a neighbourhood in the country's capital Bandar Seri Begawan. The population was 314 in 2016. It is one of the villages within Mukim Kota Batu. The postcode is BD1117.

References 

Villages in Brunei-Muara District
Neighbourhoods in Bandar Seri Begawan